The 2019 DFB-Pokal Final decided the winner of the 2018–19 DFB-Pokal, the 76th season of the annual German football cup competition. The match was played on 25 May 2019 at the Olympiastadion in Berlin.

The match featured Bundesliga clubs RB Leipzig, playing in their first final, and Bayern Munich, the record winners of the competition.

Bayern Munich won the final 3–0 for their 19th DFB-Pokal title.							
With the win, Bayern completed their 12th domestic double, and therefore played away to 2018–19 Bundesliga runners-up Borussia Dortmund in the 2019 DFL-Supercup in August 2019. Because Bayern qualified for the Champions League through the Bundesliga, the sixth-place team in the Bundesliga, VfL Wolfsburg, earned qualification for the group stage of the 2019–20 edition of the UEFA Europa League, and the league's third second round spot went to the team in seventh, Eintracht Frankfurt.

Teams
In the following table, finals until 1943 were in the Tschammerpokal era, since 1953 were in the DFB-Pokal era.

Background

The match will be the first final for RB Leipzig, competing in their seventh season of the tournament. Their previous best performance in the competition was reaching the second round on three occasions (in 2011–12, 2015–16 and 2017–18). Leipzig became the 39th unique club to reach the final, and the first final debutant since Union Berlin in 2001, an achievement reached just short of ten years since the club's founding on 19 May 2009. They are also the first club from Saxony to reach the final since Dresdner SC's win in 1941, as well as the second club from Leipzig to reach the final, after VfB Leipzig won in 1936. A victory would see RB Leipzig win their first major honour, with the club only previously winning regional league and cup titles. They would also become the first team since Bayer Leverkusen in 1993 to win in their debut final.

The final will be the last match for Ralf Rangnick as head coach of Leipzig, as he will return to his post as sporting director following the arrival of Julian Nagelsmann as coach for the 2019–20 season. Following the resignation of Ralph Hasenhüttl, Rangnick took over as head coach for the 2018–19 season, his second stint after leading the club to Bundesliga promotion in the 2015–16 season. While not serving as head coach, he has been the sporting director of the club since the 2012–13 season. The match will be the third DFB-Pokal final for Rangnick, having reached the final twice with Schalke 04 during his two stints at the club. He lost 1–2 to Bayern Munich in 2005, before winning the competition in 2011 with a 5–0 victory against MSV Duisburg.

The match will be the 23rd final for Bayern Munich, extending their competition record. Of the previous finals, Bayern have won on 18 occasions, also a competition record, and lost four times. This is the second consecutive final for Bayern, having lost in the 2018 final to Eintracht Frankfurt, who were led by now-Bayern coach Niko Kovač. Bayern's last final victory was in 2016, where they won on penalties against Borussia Dortmund. Bayern are chasing a league and cup double, having won the 2018–19 Bundesliga on the final matchday, a week prior to the final. Bayern have previously completed the double on 11 occasions (in 2013 as part of a treble), a record in Germany, most recently in 2016.

The final is the third consecutive for Bayern manager Niko Kovač, the fourth coach to do so after Hans Schmidt (with Schalke 04, losing in 1935 and 1936, winning in 1937), Udo Lattek (with Bayern Munich, winning in 1984 and 1986, losing in 1985) and Otto Rehhagel (with Werder Bremen, losing in 1989 and 1990, winning in 1991). However, Kovač is the first to accomplish this with multiple clubs in the streak. Kovač, who is in his first season with Bayern, reached the previous two finals with Eintracht Frankfurt. In 2017, he lost 1–2 to Borussia Dortmund, before winning against future employers Bayern Munich in 2018. Kovač is the second manager to reach three DFB-Pokal finals in their first three attempts, following Hans Schmidt for Schalke 04 (between 1935 and 1937). He could also become the seventh coach to win consecutive DFB-Pokal titles, following Georg Köhler (Dresdner SC, 1940 and 1941), Zlatko Čajkovski (Bayern Munich, 1966 and 1967), Dietrich Weise (Eintracht Frankfurt, 1974 and 1975), Hennes Weisweiler (1. FC Köln, 1977 and 1978), Huub Stevens (Schalke 04, 2001 and 2002) and Felix Magath (Bayern Munich, 2005 and 2006). However, Kovač would be the first to accomplish this feat with a different club in each season. While in 2018 Kovač became the fifth person to win the DFB-Pokal as player and manager, this final could see him become the second person to accomplish this for the same club, having won the 2003 final with Bayern during his playing career. This was previously accomplished by Thomas Schaaf for Werder Bremen (player in 1991 and 1994, manager in 1999, 2004 and 2009). He would also become the second person to win multiple DFB-Pokal titles as manager after having previously won the competition as a player, also along with Schaaf.

The final will be the eighth match between Leipzig and Bayern, with a record of four Bayern wins, one Leipzig win, and one draw (which Bayern won on penalties) prior. The match is the 65th unique final pairing in DFB-Pokal history. Of the prior matches, one has been in the DFB-Pokal, with the teams meeting in the second round of the previous season. The match in Leipzig finished as a 1–1 draw after extra time, with Bayern winning 5–4 in a penalty shoot-out. The remaining meetings occurred in the Bundesliga, with Bayern winning 3–0 at home and 5–4 away in the 2016–17 season. In the 2017–18 Bundesliga, Bayern won the first match 2–0 at home, before Leipzig won 2–1 at home in the second meeting. The sides will have met twice during 2018–19 season prior to the final, with Bayern winning 1–0 at home in the first meeting on 19 December 2018, and the second meeting in Leipzig as a "final preview" on 11 May 2019 finishing as a 0–0 draw.

Route to the final
The DFB-Pokal began with 64 teams in a single-elimination knockout cup competition. There were a total of five rounds leading up to the final. Teams were drawn against each other, and the winner after 90 minutes would advance. If still tied, 30 minutes of extra time was played. If the score was still level, a penalty shoot-out was used to determine the winner.

Note: In all results below, the score of the finalist is given first (H: home; A: away).

Match

Details

See also

2019 DFL-Supercup
Football in Berlin

References

External links
 
 Match report at kicker.de 
 Match report at WorldFootball.net
 Match report at Fussballdaten.de 

2019
2018–19 in German football cups
RB Leipzig matches
FC Bayern Munich matches
Football competitions in Berlin
May 2019 sports events in Germany
2019 in Berlin